Nutabe (Nutabane) is an extinct Chibchan language of Colombia, historically spoken by the Nutabe people (Adelaar & Muysken, 2004:49).

References

Chibchan languages